Ioniapolis was a town of ancient Caria that flourished during the Hellenistic period. 
 
Its site is located near Mersinet Iskelesi, Muğla Province, Turkey.

References

Populated places in ancient Caria
Former populated places in Turkey
History of Muğla Province